Lake Fork is an unincorporated community in Logan County, Illinois along Illinois Route 54.

History
Lake Fork was laid out in 1881. The community is named after Buffalo Lake, a now-vanished prairie wetland in southern Logan County on the upper reaches of the Lake Fork of Salt Creek. A post office called Lake Fork has been in operation since 1881.

References

External links
 Google Maps

Unincorporated communities in Logan County, Illinois
Unincorporated communities in Illinois